William F. Condon (September 29, 1897 – March 19, 1972) was an American politician from New York.

Life
He was born on September 29, 1897, in Yonkers, New York. He attended New York Preparatory School. From 1917 to 1919, he served in the Yonkers Naval Militia. Later he became a contractor.

Condon was a member of the New York State Assembly (Westchester Co., 5th D.) in 1928, 1929, 1930, 1931, 1932, 1933, 1934 and 1935.

He was Register of Westchester County from 1936 to 1938.

He was a member of the New York State Senate from 1939 to 1964, sitting in the 162nd, 163rd, 164th, 165th, 166th, 167th, 168th, 169th, 170th, 171st, 172nd, 173rd and 174th New York State Legislatures. In 1947, he co-sponsored the Condon-Wadlin Act which prohibited public employees to strike. In November 1964, he ran for re-election, but was defeated by Democrat Royden A. Letsen.

He died on March 19, 1972, in Yonkers, New York.

Sources

1897 births
1972 deaths
Republican Party New York (state) state senators
People from Yonkers, New York
Republican Party members of the New York State Assembly
20th-century American politicians